Kamışlı is a village in the Yüksekova District of Hakkâri Province in Turkey. The village is populated by Kurds of the Geravî tribe and had a population of 1,107 in 2022.

History 
The village was populated by 16 Assyrian families in 1850 and 12 families in 1877.

Population 
Population history from 2007 to 2022:

References 

Villages in Yüksekova District
Kurdish settlements in Hakkâri Province
Historic Assyrian communities in Turkey